Robert Murray Keith (died 1774) was a British diplomat. He was descended from a younger son of the 2nd Earl Marischal.

Keith was minister in Vienna in 1748 and from 1753 Minister-plenipotentiary. In 1757, he transferred to St. Petersburg (arriving in 1758) and remained there until October 1762, when the imperial government requested that he be replaced by a nobleman.  He then retired to live at the Hermitage near Edinburgh, and subsequently held other important diplomatic appointments, being known to his numerous friends, among whom were the leading men of letters of his time, as "Ambassador Keith."

In 1772, George III sent Robert Murray Keith to negotiate for the release of his sister Caroline Matilda, Queen of Denmark, from imprisonment. Keith succeeded in his mission and on 28 May 1772 the Queen was deported from Denmark on board a British frigate which took her to Celle Castle in her brother's German territory of Hanover.

Keith married Margaret, daughter of Sir William Cunningham, 2nd baronet, of Caprington before 1730 when their son Robert Murray Keith (the younger) was born.  Another son was Sir Basil Keith, a naval officer and Governor of Gibraltar.

References

. 

Year of birth missing
1774 deaths
Ambassadors of Great Britain to Russia
1690s births
Ambassadors of Great Britain to the Holy Roman Emperor